School District of Janesville (SDJ) is a school district headquartered in the Educational Services Center (ESC) in Janesville, Wisconsin.  the district has 10,300 students in grades PK-12 and more than 1,500 employees. With 21 campuses it is the state's tenth largest school district.

Schools
 Middle and high schools
 TAGOS Leadership Academy (charter school)

 High schools
 Joseph A. Craig High School
 Janesville International Education Program
 George S. Parker High School
 Rock River Charter School (charter school)
 Rock University High School (charter school)

 Middle schools
 Edison Middle School
 Franklin Middle School
 Marshall Middle School

 Elementary schools
 Adams Elementary School
 Harrison Elementary School
 Jackson Elementary School
 Jefferson Elementary School
 Kennedy Elementary School
 Lincoln Elementary School
 Madison Elementary School
 Monroe Elementary School
 Roosevelt Elementary School
 Van Buren Elementary School
 Washington Elementary School
 Wilson Elementary School

 Preschool
 Preschool 4 Janesville (P4J)

 Virtual school
 Arise Virtual Academy (charter school)

References

External links
 School District of Janesville

School districts in Wisconsin
Education in Rock County, Wisconsin